Boy Wonder may refer to:
The Boy Wonder or Robin, Batman's sidekick
Boy Wonder (novel), a 1988 novel by James Robert Baker
Boy Wonder (film), a 2010 film starring Caleb Steinmeyer
Boy Wonder (album), a compilation album by Lenny Breau
Boy Wonder (producer) (born 1978), music producer, musician, and filmmaker
Joel Selwood or Boy Wonder, Australian rules footballer
Jim Christiana, a Pennsylvania state legislator
Boy Wonder, the earlier name of the boy band Dream Street
Boy wonder, a Jewish gangster in The Apprenticeship of Duddy Kravitz
Steny Hoyer, a Maryland Congressman
Bucky Harris, an MLB second baseman for the Washington Senators who, in 1924, was promoted to Manager at age 27 and led the team to the World Championship that year

See also
Boi-1da (born 1986), Canadian hip-hop producer
Wonder boy (disambiguation)

ru:Вундеркинд